The William J. Fantle House is a historic house in Yankton, South Dakota. It was built in 1917 for William J. Fantle, the co-founder of Fantle Bros, a dry good store. It was designed in the Prairie School style by architect Peter J. Linhoff. It has been listed on the National Register of Historic Places since October 10, 1989.

References

		
National Register of Historic Places in Yankton County, South Dakota
Prairie School architecture in South Dakota
Houses completed in 1917
1917 establishments in South Dakota